Aymen Mejri (born 16 August 1988) is a Tunisian rower. He competed in the men's single sculls event at the 2012 Summer Olympics.

References

1988 births
Living people
Tunisian male rowers
Olympic rowers of Tunisia
Rowers at the 2012 Summer Olympics
Sportspeople from Tunis
21st-century Tunisian people